SDG (and SDGs) are Sustainable Development Goals, a set of 17 global goals established by the United Nations.

SDG may also refer to:

Organizations
 SDG Group, a management consulting firm
 Serb Volunteer Guard, a former Serbian volunteer paramilitary unit
 Soli Deo Gloria (record label)
 Swarm Development Group, American non-profit organization

Other uses
 Secoisolariciresinol diglucoside, an anti-oxidant phytochemical
 Soli Deo gloria (S.D.G.), Latin term for "Glory to God alone"
 Sudanese pound (ISO 4217 code)
 United Counties of Stormont, Dundas and Glengarry, a municipality in Ontario, Canada